Afrapia is an extinct genus of wasp which existed in Botswana during the late Cretaceous period. It contains the species Afrapia globularis and Afrapia variicornis.

References

Stephanoidea
Prehistoric Hymenoptera genera
Late Cretaceous insects
Hymenoptera of Africa
Fossil taxa described in 2009